Mark Conroy (born 1957 in Melbourne) is an Australian actor. He is also known for his international modelling career.

He is perhaps best known for his role as Glen Young in the television soap opera Sons and Daughters in 1985–86. He then played crooked shark fisherman Zac Burgess in Home and Away. He is no longer working at Shaftesbury School teaching science. He left St Michael's Catholic Grammar school in 2018. He has now retired back to Australia

References

External links
 

Australian male television actors
People from Melbourne
Living people
1957 births